Albert Agyemang (born 4 October 1977) is a retired Ghanaian sprinter who specialized in the 200 metres.

He has competed in two Olympic Games, in 1996 and 2000.

His personal best time is 20.64 seconds, achieved in July 1999 in Tampere. The Ghanaian record currently belongs to Emmanuel Tuffour with 20.15 seconds.

References

External links

1977 births
Living people
Ghanaian male sprinters
Athletes (track and field) at the 1996 Summer Olympics
Athletes (track and field) at the 2000 Summer Olympics
Olympic athletes of Ghana